The 1959 All-Big Ten Conference football team consists of American football players chosen by various organizations for All-Big Ten Conference teams for the 1959 Big Ten Conference football season.

All-Big Ten selections

Quarterbacks
 Dean Look, Michigan State (AP-1; UPI-2)
 Dale Hackbart, Wisconsin (AP-2; UPI-1)
 Olen Treadway, Iowa (AP-3; UPI-3)

Halfbacks
 Bob Jeter, Iowa (AP-1; UPI-1)
 Ron Burton, Northwestern (AP-1; UPI-1)
 Ray Jauch, Iowa (AP-2; UPI-2)
 Ray Purdin, Northwestern (AP-2; UPI-2)
 Herb Adderly, Michigan State (AP-3; UPI-3)
 Bob Jarus, Purdue (UPI-3)
 Vic Jones, Indiana (AP-3)

Fullbacks
 Mike Stock, Northwestern (AP-1; UPI-1)
 Bill Brown, Illinois (AP-2; UPI-2)
 Bob White, Ohio State (AP-3; UPI-3)

Ends
 Jim Houston, Ohio State (AP-1; UPI-1)
 Don Norton, Iowa (AP-1; UPI-1)
 Elbert Kimbrough, Northwestern (AP-2; UPI-2)
 Earl Faison, Indiana (AP-3; UPI-2)
 Ted Aucreman, Indiana (AP-2; UPI-3)
 Dick Brooks, Purdue (AP-3; UPI-3)

Tackles
 Dan Lanphear, Wisconsin (AP-1; UPI-1)
 Joe Rutgens, Illinois (AP-1; UPI-2)
 Gene Gossage, Northwestern (AP-2; UPI-1)
 Jerry Beabout, Purdue (UPI-2)
 Jim Heineke, Wisconsin (AP-2; UPI-3)
 Mike Wright, Minnesota (UPI-3)
 Palmer Pyle, Michigan State (AP-3)
 Jim Tyrer, Ohio State (AP-3)

Guards
 Jerry Stalcup, Wisconsin (AP-1; UPI-1)
 Bill Burrell, Illinois (AP-1; UPI-1)
 Tom Brown, Minnesota (AP-3; UPI-2)
 Ron Maltony, Purdue (AP-2; UPI-2)
 Ron Perkins, Wisconsin (AP-2)
 Pete Arena, Northwestern (AP-3; UPI-3)
 Ernie Wright, Ohio State (UPI-3)

Centers
 Jim Andreotti, Northwestern (AP-1; UPI-1) 
 Bill Lapham, Iowa (AP-2; UPI-2)
 Dave Manders, Michigan State (UPI-3)
 Jerry Smith, Michigan (AP-3)

Key
AP = Associated Press

UPI = United Press International, selected by the conference coaches

Bold = Consensus first-team selections by the AP and UPI

See also
1959 College Football All-America Team

References

All-Big Ten Conference
All-Big Ten Conference football teams